Steven Howard "Steve" Fraser (born March 23, 1958) is an American Greco-Roman wrestler and coach. He was the 1984 Olympic Games gold medalist in Greco-Roman wrestling, in the 90 kg weight class. Fraser's gold medal was the first ever for the United States in Greco-Roman wrestling.

A native of Hazel Park, Michigan, Fraser was a Michigan High School Athletic Association (MHSAA) state wrestling champion. In college he was a two-time All-American wrestler, wrestling at the University of Michigan. Fraser's gold medal was the first ever Olympic gold in Greco-Roman wrestling for the United States. The next night following Fraser's gold medal performance, Jeff Blatnick won a second gold medal for the U.S. Greco-Roman Olympic team. Fraser served as coach of the U.S. Greco Roman team from 1997 to 2014. Rulon Gardner who was a gold medalist at the 2000 Olympic Games, credits Fraser's instruction as a large part of his wrestling success. The year Fraser competed at the Olympics in 1984, the United States won 9 gold medals in wrestling, the largest American total in a single Olympics since 1896.

Fraser was inducted into the National Wrestling Hall of Fame as a Distinguished Member in 1994 and the Michigan Sports Hall of Fame in 2008.

References

External links 
 
 

1958 births
Living people
American male sport wrestlers
Olympic gold medalists for the United States in wrestling
Wrestlers at the 1984 Summer Olympics
Medalists at the 1984 Summer Olympics
University of Michigan alumni
People from Hazel Park, Michigan
Pan American Games medalists in wrestling
Pan American Games gold medalists for the United States
Wrestlers at the 1983 Pan American Games
20th-century American people